Johann Baptist Martinelli or Giovanni Battista Martinelli (February 1701 – June 21, 1754) was an Austrian architect and  of Italian descent.

He was born in Vienna, the son of architect Franz Martinelli. In cooperation with his brother Anton Erhard Martinelli, he designed the plans of several baroque churches in the Habsburg empire, including the church in Grossweikersdorf,  the Holy Trinity Cathedral in Blaj and the church in Dunaalmás. He also designed several mansions among which the one in Dolná Krupá.  He died in his native city of Vienna, aged 53.

See also
 Bratislava Castle

References
 Jana Šulcová - Drei Kapitel aus der Baugeschichte des Schlosses Dolná Krupá
 Marius Porumb: Catedrala Sfânta Treime din Blaj la 1751, în: Acta Musei Napocensis 32 (1995), p. 353-357.
 Pfarrkirche Grossweikersdorf
 Catedrala Sfânta Treime
 A Dunaalmási Római Katolikus Egyház történetéből

1701 births
1754 deaths
Austrian Baroque architects
Artists from Vienna
Austrian people of Italian descent